Pigmentatio reticularis faciei et colli is a cutaneous condition characterized by a disturbance of human pigmentation.

See also 
 Erythromelanosis follicularis faciei et colli
 List of cutaneous conditions

References 

Disturbances of human pigmentation